Barnim IV of Pomerania (1325 – 22 August 1365) was a Duke of Pomerania-Wolgast-Rügen.

Life 
He was the second son of Duke Wartislaw IV of Pomerania-Wolgast and the brother of Bogislaw V and Wartislaw V.

He married Sophie of Werle (1329–1364), the daughter of John II of Werle. They had two sons, Wartislaw VI and Bogislaw VI, and a daughter, Elisabeth, who married Duke Magnus I of Mecklenburg.

He inherited Pomerania-Wolgast-Rügen when his father died in 1326. He was one year old at the time. He shared a guardian with his brother Bogislaw V, Duke of Pomerania-Wolgast-Rügen.

Emperor Charles IV granted Barnim IV Imperial immediacy in 1348.

Ancestors

External links 
 Genealogy mittelalter.de

Pomeranian nobility
14th-century German nobility
1325 births
1365 deaths
Dukes of Pomerania